The Christian Holiness Partnership is an international organization of individuals, organizational and denominational affiliates within the holiness movement.  It was founded under the leadership of Rev. John Swanel Inskip in 1867 as the National Camp Meeting Association for Christian Holiness, later changing its name to the National Holiness Association, by which it was known until 1997, when its current name was adopted.  Its stated purpose is to promote "the message of scriptural holiness" primarily through evangelistic camp meetings. The Christian Holiness Partnership is headquartered in Clinton, Tennessee. 

The Christian Holiness Partnership facilitates cooperative efforts among denominations, camp meetings, institutions such as colleges, seminaries, missionary agencies and publishing houses, and individuals.

Its membership includes twenty-one denominations, three missionary agencies, forty-eight colleges and seminaries, six publishing houses, two thousand camp meetings, and individual local churches.

The last known website for the organization is holiness.org as captured by Internet Archive on October, 18. 2001. The site documented both Dr. Marlin Hotle (editor of the Holiness Digest and the District Superintendent of the Tennessee District of The Wesleyan Church) as the Executive Director of the Christian Holiness Partnership and the Partnership Press as publisher for the CHP.

Member bodies

As of 2005, affiliated Protestant churches and organizations included:

American Rescue Workers
The Association of Evangelical Churches, Inc.
Association of Independent Methodists
Bible Holiness Movement
Brethren in Christ Church
Churches of Christ in Christian Union
Church of God (Anderson)
Church of the Nazarene
Congregational Methodist Church
Evangelical Christian Church
Evangelical Church of North America
Evangelical Friends Church - Eastern Region
Evangelical Methodist Church
Free Methodist Church
Japan Immanuel General Mission
Kentucky Mountain Holiness Association
Missionary Church (North Central District)
Primitive Methodist Church
The Salvation Army (USA)
The Salvation Army (Canada & Bermuda)
United Methodist Church
Wesleyan Church

See also 

Interchurch Holiness Convention
Wesleyan Holiness Consortium
Global Wesleyan Alliance

References

Evangelical parachurch organizations
Holiness movement
Methodist organizations